Farsi Jan (also Romanized as Fārsī Jān) is a village in Saruq Rural District, Saruq District, Farahan County, Markazi Province, Iran. At the 2006 census, its population was 391, in 122 families.

References 

Populated places in Farahan County